Miranda Taylor Cosgrove (born May 14, 1993) is an American actress, singer and songwriter. She was the highest-paid child actor in 2012 and was included on Forbes magazine's "30 Under 30" list in 2022. She is known for her career on television, particularly for her work in comedy drama productions, commercials, and hosting.

Cosgrove began her career at the age of seven, making several appearances in television commercials. Thereafter, she made her acting debut in Richard Linklater's comedy film School of Rock (2003). She went on to play a number of minor television roles before starring as Megan Parker on the sitcom Drake & Josh (2004–2007); this established her as a child actress and introduced her to a wider audience.

Cosgrove further rose to prominence starring as Carly Shay in the teen sitcom iCarly (2007–2012), for which she earned several accolades, including two Young Artist Awards and four Kids' Choice Awards. She made her musical debut in 2008 with the titular soundtrack album for the series in which she performed four songs. In 2009, she debuted her first extended play, About You Now. Her debut studio album, Sparks Fly, was released in April 2010. The album featured the single "Kissin U" which peaked at number 54 on the Billboard Hot 100 and was certified gold. Her second extended play, High Maintenance, was released the following year.

Cosgrove is the voice of Margo in the animated film series Despicable Me (2010–present), which is the highest-grossing animated film franchise and the 15th highest-grossing film franchise of all time. Cosgrove has starred in leading roles in the films The Intruders (2015), 3022 (2019), and North Hollywood (2021). She hosts the CBS television show Mission Unstoppable with Miranda Cosgrove (2019–present), which earned her a Daytime Emmy Award nomination. She reprises the role of Carly Shay on the iCarly revival series of the same name (2021–present), which she also executive produces; similar to its predecessor, it has received acclaim.

Early life
Cosgrove was born in Los Angeles to Tom Cosgrove, who owns a dry-cleaning business, and Chris (née Casey), a homemaker. She has said that she is of Irish, English, and French descent. She is an only child and was homeschooled from sixth grade onwards. She struggled with body image during childhood. Before becoming an actress, she wanted to be a veterinarian.

Career

1996–2003: Early years and breakthrough 
At the age of three, she was discovered by a talent agent while singing and dancing at the Los Angeles restaurant Taste of L.A. Cosgrove says that when the agent approached her and her mother, she had "never really thought of being an actress" and "was lucky". She then appeared in numerous television commercials for McDonald's and Mello Yello, and also modeled for various brands. At the age of seven, she began auditioning for theater and television roles. Her first television appearance was in 2001 when she provided the voice of young Lana Lang in the pilot episode of Smallville.

Cosgrove made her film debut in School of Rock (2003), directed by Richard Linklater. In the movie, she played Summer Hathaway, a young girl with great ambition and discipline who finds herself adjusting to the free-spirited nature of her new music teacher (Jack Black). School of Rock was both a box office hit, grossing over $130 million worldwide, and a critical success, receiving a score of 91% on Rotten Tomatoes. Cosgrove's acting in the film received praise, with David Ansen of Newsweek describing it as "spot on". She cited the scene in which her character tries to sing as particularly difficult: "[I'd] been taking singing lessons for about five years, so getting to sing badly was new. The director kept saying, 'Try to sing even worse, Miranda,' so it was weird."

2004–2009: Rise to prominence

In 2004, Cosgrove landed her first major role in a television series when she was cast in the Nickelodeon series Drake & Josh, alongside Drake Bell and Josh Peck. In the series, she portrayed Megan Parker, the mischievous younger sister of the title characters. In 2005, Cosgrove was awarded the role of Munch in the Cartoon Network film Here Comes Peter Cottontail: The Movie. In the film, Cosgrove portrays a female mouse who is rescued from a hawk by Junior and Flutter and who goes on to join them on their adventure. Cosgrove also guest-starred on two episodes of the animated comedy, Lilo & Stitch: The Series. She also received her second major role in a theatrical film when she cast alongside her Drake & Josh co-star Drake Bell in the comedy film Yours, Mine & Ours. The film performed mildly at the box office. Yours, Mine & Ours opened in third place, earning $17 million at the U.S. box office during its first weekend. Cosgrove's third theatrical release, Keeping Up with the Steins, was released in 2006. It received generally negative reviews from critics and performed poorly at the box office. She also earned a role in the straight-to-DVD film The Wild Stallion (2009).

Cosgrove made guest appearances in a number of Nickelodeon series, the first of which was Zoey 101. Cosgrove later guest starred on an episode of Unfabulous, which starred Emma Roberts. Cosgrove was cast as the titular lead character in the sitcom iCarly, which premiered on September 8, 2007. Creator Dan Schneider tailored iCarly around the interest young people have in the internet; viewers could submit their own videos and be included in the sitcom. The final Drake & Josh episode was aired on September 16, 2007. By the summer of 2008, iCarly was the third highest rated series in the 9–14 demographic. The "iCarly Saves TV" special became the most-viewed entertainment show on cable television in June 2008.

Cosgrove's debut as a recording artist began with the iCarly theme song "Leave It All to Me", which featured Drake Bell and was released as a single on December 2, 2007. In June 2008, Columbia Records released the iCarly soundtrack, which featured four songs performed by Cosgrove and debuted at number one on the Billboard Kid Albums chart. "Stay My Baby" and "About You Now" were released as singles from the album; the latter peaked at number 47 on the Billboard Hot 100. In December 2008, a cover of the holiday song "Christmas Wrapping" was released to promote the hour-long special Merry Christmas, Drake & Josh. On February 3, 2009, Cosgrove released her debut extended play About You Now. To promote the 2009 animated film Cloudy with a Chance of Meatballs, Columbia Records released the promotional single "Raining Sunshine" with an accompanying music video in August 2009. Cosgrove became one of MTV's Female Pop Rookies of 2009.

2010–2015: Professional expansion 

On March 17, 2010, it was reported that Cosgrove signed a deal, reportedly in the "low- to mid-seven-figure range" to do 26 additional episodes of iCarly. Cosgrove also voiced Margo in Universal Studios' 3-D computer animated feature Despicable Me, released in July 2010. In 2010, Cosgrove worked with songwriters The Matrix, Dr. Luke, Max Martin, Leah Haywood and Daniel James for her debut studio album, later revealed to be titled Sparks Fly. "Kissin U" was released as the sole single from Sparks Fly and premiered on Ryan Seacrest's radio show on March 12, 2010. "Kissin U" became Cosgrove's best-selling single release, peaking at number 54 on the Billboard Hot 100 and being certified gold. Sparks Fly was released in April 2010 and peaked at number 8 on the US Billboard 200 chart. In January 2011, Cosgrove revealed that her follow-up EP would be titled High Maintenance. The first single from the EP, "Dancing Crazy", was written by Max Martin, Shellback and Avril Lavigne, and produced by Martin and Shellback. The single peaked on the Billboard Hot 100 at number 100.

On January 24, 2011, she embarked on the Dancing Crazy Tour. The tour began in Missouri, traveled throughout the United States, and ended in Ohio. On July 15, 2011, the tour continued with the title, Dancing Crazy Summer Tour; Cosgrove traveled the United States and Canada and performed at music festivals and state fairs. On May 17, 2012, it was announced that iCarly's sixth season would be its last. The series finale, "iGoodbye", aired on November 23, 2012. On January 24, 2012, Cosgrove was featured on the iCarly soundtrack, iCarly: iSoundtrack II. Following the filming of iCarly's finale in June 2012, Cosgrove embarked on a new tour dubbed the Summer Tour in July and August 2012.

On February 15, 2013, Deadline reported that Cosgrove would star in Girlfriend in a Coma, a television series written by Liz Brixius for NBC and adapted from the novel of the same title by Douglas Coupland. However, following production difficulties, the project was canceled. Cosgrove again voiced Margo in Despicable Me 2, released on June 5. In 2013, she appeared in the animated short films Training Wheels as Margo and Gru's Girls as Savana. In December, she announced on The Today Show that she was recording a new album. In 2014, Cosgrove performed voice work in the animated film A Mouse Tale, which was released on February 10, 2015. Cosgrove also starred in the horror film The Intruders with Austin Butler, portraying the role of Rose Halshford.

2016–present: Current work 
In May 2016, Cosgrove was cast in the NBC sitcom Crowded, which was cancelled after one season. In 2017, Cosgrove reprised her role as Margo once again in Despicable Me 3, which was released on June 14, 2017. In 2019, Cosgrove appeared in the limited budget Netflix science fiction film 3022. Since 2019, she has been the host of Mission Unstoppable with Miranda Cosgrove, a show which airs on CBS and earned the actress a Daytime Emmy Award nomination in 2020. Cosgrove reprised her role as Carly Shay in an iCarly revival, which premiered on Paramount+ in June 2021, and its second season premiered in April 2022. She additionally serves as an executive producer for the series, on which Cosgrove stated "I knew from a really young age how the executive producer of the show pretty much got to decide almost every aspect, now I get to have a say in everything." Alike to its predecessor, the revival has earned acclaim. Cosgrove hosted the 2022 Kids' Choice Awards alongside Rob Gronkowski on April 9, 2022, where she won the award for Favorite Female TV Star, marking her second win from the Kids' Choice Awards. She was also included on Forbes magazine's "30 Under 30" list in 2022.

Personal life
Cosgrove attended the University of Southern California in 2012.

She is an active supporter of St. Jude Children's Research Hospital in Memphis, Tennessee. She also visits other children's hospitals and considers Education Through Music one of her favorite charities. She is a national spokesperson for Light the Night Walk, an organization that creates awareness for blood cancer.

Filmography

Film

Television

Video games

Discography

 Sparks Fly (2010)

Concert tours
 Dancing Crazy Tour (2011)
 Summer Tour (2012)

Awards and nominations

Cosgrove has won two Young Artist Awards and two Kids' Choice Awards, as well as receiving a number of nominations from both. She has won various awards in recognition for her public image. In the 2012 edition of the Guinness World Records, Cosgrove was listed as the highest paid child actress, for her work on iCarly. In 2020, she received a Daytime Emmy Award nomination for her work on Mission Unstoppable with Miranda Cosgrove.

References

External links

 
 

 
1993 births
Living people
21st-century American actresses
21st-century American singers
21st-century American women singers
Actresses from Los Angeles
American child actresses
American child singers
American film actresses
American people of English descent
American people of French descent
American people of Irish descent
American philanthropists
American television actresses
American video game actresses
American voice actresses
American women pop singers
Child pop musicians
Columbia Records artists
Epic Records artists
People from Los Angeles
Singers from Los Angeles
USC School of Cinematic Arts alumni